The Fourth Department or fourth department may refer to:

 Fourth Department of the Cabinet Legislation Bureau of Japan
 Fourth Department of the New York Supreme Court, Appellate Division
 Fourth Department of the People's Liberation Army of China
 Fourth Department of the Vicariate of Rome; see 
 Older name of Soviet military intelligence, now Russian Federation's Main Intelligence Directorate